Long Way from Home is a 1979 EP by British hard rock band Whitesnake. The titular song was written by lead singer David Coverdale, and "Trouble" and "Ain't No Love in the Heart of the City" are the B-side tracks. The song was taken from the band's album Lovehunter, and was the lead-off track. The song charted at number 55 on the UK Singles Chart in 1979.

The Japanese release was the single, and its B-side was "Walking in the Shadow of the Blues".

Lyrics
The song uses the lyric "long, long way from home" in its chorus, but the song itself only has one "Long" in the title. This was likely done to avoid confusion with Foreigner's similarly titled 1977 hit, Long, Long Way from Home.

Track listing 
UK EP
"Long Way from Home" - 4:56
"Trouble" – 5:00 (live at Hammersmith 1978)
"Ain't No Love in the Heart of the City" – 6:36 (live at Hammersmith 1978)

Japanese release
"Long Way from Home" - 4:56
"Walking in the Shadow of the Blues" - 4:24

Personnel 
 David Coverdale – vocals
 Micky Moody – guitars
 Bernie Marsden – guitars
 Neil Murray – bass
 Dave Dowle – drums
 Jon Lord – keyboards
Martin Birch - producer

Charts

References

1979 EPs
1979 singles
Whitesnake EPs
Songs written by David Coverdale
Song recordings produced by Martin Birch
United Artists Records singles
Geffen Records EPs
Hard rock EPs
Blues rock EPs
British hard rock songs
British blues rock songs